, also known as , is a Japanese anime television series produced by Production IMS. Yuu Nobuta directed the anime and Reiko Yoshida handled the series composition, with character designs by Naoto Nakamura and original character designs by Atto. The series aired in Japan from April to June 2016. A manga adaptation illustrated by Kanari Abe began serialization in Media Factory's seinen manga magazine Monthly Comic Alive December 2015 issue released on October 27, 2015. An anime film produced by A-1 Pictures premiered on January 18, 2020.

Plot
The story follows a girl named Akeno Misaki who enrolls into  in Yokosuka, Kanagawa in order to become one of the highly regarded Blue Mermaids. As Akeno and her classmates set off aboard the fictional Kagerō-class destroyer , an incident with their instructor suddenly leads them to be accused of mutiny. Thus, Akeno must lead her crewmates in sailing the Harekaze as they try to find the truth about what's happening while also avoiding pursuit.

Characters

Bridge
 

The main heroine and captain of the Harekaze, who treats her crew as family. While not particularly bright or talented, she is good at remembering people's names and shows good judgement under pressure. She is also known to have a fear of lightning because of her past that caused her parents to go missing on a cruise during a storm.

 

The deputy captain of the Harekaze, who wishes to follow her mother and sisters' footsteps as a Blue Mermaid. She constantly bemoans her bad luck and seems to have ailurophobia, but later overcomes it upon taking ownership of a cat after rescuing it from a stranded ship that had its original owners on it. She also likes stuffed animals and she places them in her cabin.

 

The artillery officer of the Harekaze. She is usually quiet, speaks in bursts and likes curry, but her gunnery skills are to a extent where her shots that she calculates are mostly accurate and spot on.

 

The torpedo officer of the Harekaze. She enjoys battle where she is eager to fire the weapons onboard at enemy vessels.

 

Secretary of the Harekaze, who tends to speak her mind in a dramatic way, including theories and what others may be thinking. She feels that fiction is more real than non-fiction and often lets her tongue and imagination get out of hand. She always gets information out of the tablet she carries whenever they are in a battle and relays it to the bridge crew.

 

The Chief Navigator of the Harekaze. She is easily scared, and always wanting to run away whenever battle draws near, but never does so and uses her abilities to steer the ship to a extent where the crew recognizes her own efforts.

Combat

 

An artillery officer assigned to the firing command post of the ship.

 

An artillery officer assigned to the firing command post of the ship.

 

An artillery officer assigned to the firing command post of the ship.

 

An artillery officer assigned to one of the Harekazes torpedo tubes.

 

An artillery officer assigned to one of the Harekazes torpedo tubes.

 

Sonar Personnel as well as the Bugler of the ship. She's surprisingly skilled with naginata techniques.

Navigation
 

A navigation officer and the interim helmsman of the Harekaze. She is often candid and unafraid to be straightforward, and tends to end her sentences with "zona".

 

A navigation officer assigned to the port-side of the ship. She's always seen with her eyes closed.

 

A navigation officer assigned to the Starboard-side of the ship.

 

Sonar technician of the ship. She's quite skilled in communication.

 

 

The look-out of the Harekaze. She has hyperopia, and as such wears glasses. She's quite skilled at shooting (squirt guns).

Engineering
 

Chief of engineering of the Harekaze. She's the shortest among her staff.

 

Assistant engineer of the Harekaze and Maron's best friend. She's one of the more mature looking members of the crew. She's quite skilled in sumo wrestling.

 

One of the Harekaze's engineer who likes to play cards and gossiping.

 

One of the Harekaze's engineer who likes to play cards and talk rumors.

 

One of the Harekaze's engineer who likes to play cards and gossiping.

 

One of the Harekaze's engineer who likes to play cards and talk rumors.
 

An engineering officer assigned to check for ship damage and supplies. She wears biker shorts and a jacket and sports a ponytail on her right side.

 

An engineering officer assigned to check for ship damage and supplies. She wears glasses and a bonnet.

Logistics
 

Head of Logistics. She has an affection for the ship's look-out Matchy.

 

The head cook of the Harekaze.

 

One of the Harekazes cooks and Akane's twin sister.

 

One of the Harekazes cooks and Homare's twin sister.

 

The medic of the Harekaze. Known as the first genius graduating from the Marine medical university, she is on board to complete her sea training. Her investigation on the virus-carrying creature that infected the Chief artillery officer and causing the other ships to go astray led her to develop an antibody to solve the virus problem. She usually gives Akeno advice and likes to say Chinese proverbs and idioms.

Others
 

Akeno's childhood friend and captain of the Musashi.

 

A student of Wilhelmshaven Maritime High School and deputy captain of the German cruiser Admiral Graf Spee. She is rescued by Akeno after she fled from her ship and joins her on the Harekaze but the real reason was that her captain ordered her to escape in order not to fall victim to the virus infection that spread to the whole ship. An expert on anti-submarine warfare, she later becomes Mashiro's roommate and an assistant to the bridge crew in their journey.

The captain of the Sarushima who teaches the students of the Harekaze. At the start of sea training, she attacked them but is unable to remember why after coming to her senses. It was later found out that it was due to a virus-infected rodent-like creature.

The principal of Naval Academy and Mashiro's mother.

Mashiro's older sister and a member of the Blue Mermaids.

A cat who lives on the Harekaze'''s bridge. He is seemingly immune to the effects of the virus, therefore handling infected rodent-like creatures without problems.

Media

Anime
The anime series, produced by Production IMS, was broadcast in Japan from April 9 to June 25, 2016 and was simulcast by Crunchyroll, Daisuki, and Funimation. The opening theme is "High Free Spirits" by TrySail while the ending theme is "Ripple Effect" by Luna Haruna. A character song single titled  performed by Shiina Natsukawa and Sora Amamiya was released on April 6, 2016. The series is licensed in North America by Aniplex of America. The anime has been licensed in the UK by Anime Limited. A two-part original video animation project was released between March 31 and May 24, 2017. In 2017, scholar Takayoshi Yamamura noted that the series was produced in the collaboration with the JMSDF. Yamamura further explained that the series worked with the Kanagawa Provincial Cooperation Office to make a recruiting poster for JSDF members and noted that the JMSDF used their official Twitter account to emphasize their active collaboration, with criticism of them for being "too outspoken."

Episode list
{|class="wikitable" style="width:100%; margin:auto; background:#FFF;"
|- style="border-bottom: 3px solid #CCF;"
! style="width:3em;"  | No.
! Title
! style="width:10em;" | Original air date
|-

{{Episode list
| EpisodeNumber       = 4
| Title               = Maidens in a Pinch!
| TranslitTitle       = Otome no Pinchi!
| NativeTitle         = 乙女のピンチ！
| NativeTitleLangCode = ja 
| OriginalAirDate     = 
| ShortSummary        = Needing more supplies for the ship, particularly toilet paper, Akeno and a few others make an excursion to a nearby ocean shopping mall. Meanwhile, as Mashiro has worries about being compared to her mother, the principal, a peculiar rodent is picked up on the ship. Just as the girls get their supplies, they are confronted by some Blue Mermaids who capture Akeno. As ships surround the Harekaze, Shima Tateishi suddenly becomes possessed by something and starts shooting at the other ships until Wilhelmina stops her. Afterwards, it is revealed the ships are those of the Safety Oversight Office, who believe in the Harekazes innocence and give them some supplies. Meanwhile, the rodent that was found in the box picked up earlier is sent to the medical room, where Minami decides to investigate it, believing it to be not a hamster or a rat.
}}

{{Episode list
| EpisodeNumber       = 9
| Title               = Mina in a Pinch!
| TranslitTitle       = Mīna de pinchi!
| NativeTitle         = ミーナでピンチ！
| NativeTitleLangCode = ja 
| OriginalAirDate     = 
| ShortSummary        = Upon splitting up with the Blue Mermaids to investigate two large ships headed in different locations, the Harekaze come across the Admiral Spee, Wilhelmina's ship. The Harekaze launches an attack on the Spee in an attempt to stop it, only to find it is not trying to evade their torpedoes, keeping them from targeting their weak point. Remember her last encounter with the Spee, Akeno, Wilhelmina, and some others take skippers to sneak aboard while the Harekaze distracts it. As Akeno's group make their way past the infected Spee crew, Wilhelmina faces off against her captain, Thea Kreutzer, and Kaburagi manages to administer with the vaccine, stopping the Spees attack. As Wilhelmina returns to Spee, she has a tearful farewell with Coco.
}}

{{Episode list
| EpisodeNumber       = 11
| Title               = In a Pinch with a Battleship's Big Cannon!
| TranslitTitle       = Daikankyohō de Pinchi!
| NativeTitle         = 大艦巨砲でピンチ！
| NativeTitleLangCode = ja 
| OriginalAirDate     = 
| ShortSummary        = Akeno becomes anxious over putting her crewmates in danger again as the Harekaze is sent to pursue the Musashi. While the Blue Mermaids try to rescue and stop the Musashi, Moeka, who has been trapped on the bridge with a few crewmates, recalls how the rest of her crew became infected and took control over the ship. As the Blue Mermaids ships begin to diminish under the Musashi's firepower, Akeno expresses her fears about letting her crewmates get hurt. Receiving some advice from Maron, Mashiro and the rest of the crew give Akeno their support, encouraging her to take action and head off to rescue the Musashi.
}}

|}

Video game
A smartphone game for iOS and Android devices titled  has been announced for release in 2018. This was later pushed back to Spring 2019 due to the need for refinement. Pre-registration began at the same time as the initial announcement. The game was officially released on March 27, 2019. An announcement was made on 26 February 2020 that the game would be ending service on 25 March 2020 at 2:00pm JST.

Aniplex partnered with Wargaming to bring the world and characters of High School Fleet to the online video game World of Warships''

Film

The official website announced the production of an anime film on April 7, 2018. The film is produced by A-1 Pictures and directed by Jun Nakagawa, with Yuu Nobuta serving as chief director. Takaaki Suzuki and Kunihiko Okada are credited as the film's scriptwriters. The rest of the main staff and cast from the anime series are returning to reprise their roles. It was released in Japan on January 18, 2020.

Notes

References

External links
  
 

Anime with original screenplays
Aniplex
Comics set in the 1940s
Media Factory manga
Production IMS
Seinen manga
Television shows set in Yokosuka, Kanagawa
Tokyo MX original programming